The 70th edition of the Kuurne–Brussels–Kuurne cycling classic was held on 25 February 2018. It was part of the 2018 UCI Europe Tour and ranked as a 1.HC event. It was the second and concluding race of the Belgian opening weekend, the year's first road races in Northwestern Europe, one day after Omloop Het Nieuwsblad.

Teams
Twenty-five teams were invited to start the race. These included sixteen UCI WorldTeams and nine UCI Professional Continental teams.

Results

References

External links

2018
2018 UCI Europe Tour
2018 in Belgian sport